Charitomenosuchus (meaning "graceful crocodile") is an extinct genus of machimosaurid teleosauroid from the Callovian Oxford Clay Formation of England.
 
The type species, C. leedsi, was originally named "Steneosaurus" leedsi by Andrews in 1909 on the basis of three specimens. In her unpublished 2019 thesis, Michela Johnson coined the nomen ex dissertationae Charitomenosuchus for S. leedsi. The genus name was published in 2020.

References 

Thalattosuchians
Prehistoric crocodylomorphs
Fossil taxa described in 2020
Prehistoric pseudosuchian genera